Cheshmeh Saran Rural District is a rural district (dehestan) in Cheshmeh Saran District, Azadshahr County, Golestan Province, Iran. At the 2006 census, its population was 10,550, in 2,557 families.  The rural district has 19 villages.

References 

Rural Districts of Golestan Province
Azadshahr County